Jake Lee may refer to:

Jake Lee (footballer) (born 1991), English footballer
Jake Lee (painter) (1915–1991), Chinese-American painter
Jake Lee (wrestler) (born 1989), Korean professional wrestler
Jake E. Lee (born 1957), American guitarist